Frank A. Smith (August 31, 1911 – February 23, 1975) was an American cartoon animator and film director. He was the father of actor and film director Charles Martin Smith, and the brother of animator/director Paul J. Smith and animator Hank Smith.

Biography
Born in Gladstone, Michigan, Smith left home in his teens with the dream of working in films. Not having any money, he made his way across country to Hollywood by hitching rides illegally on freight trains. After some time of living as a hobo, he finally reached Hollywood in 1930.

Smith eventually was hired on as an animator at the Fleischer Studios in the late 1930s. He worked on several feature films with that studio, including Gulliver's Travels (1939) and various short films including Popeye cartoons and Betty Boop.  He then joined UPA studios, working alongside Robert Cannon, John Hubley and others. His films at UPA included the Oscar-winning Gerald McBoing-Boing (1951).

For three years Smith directed and produced films in Paris, France, for Cineaste Productions, winning many awards. His work in the 1960s included commercials and short films for Playhouse Pictures, followed by a long association with director/producer Bill Melendez, animating many of the Peanuts television specials including  A Charlie Brown Christmas, It's the Great Pumpkin, Charlie Brown and the feature films A Boy Named Charlie Brown and Snoopy Come Home.

External links

1911 births
1975 deaths
People from Gladstone, Michigan
American animators
Film directors from Michigan